The North American Meat Processors Association (NAMP) was an industry group for meat processors, packers, and distributors. It was a nonprofit, membership-based group with significant presence in the U.S., Canada and the Caribbean.  Its Executive Director was Phil Kimball.  The Executive Committee included John DeBenedetti, Chairman of Del Monte Meat Company (U.S.); Brent Cator, President of Cardinal Meat Specialists. Ltd (Canada); Mark Shuket, Vice President of Old World Provisions (U.S.); Michael Strauss, Treasurer of Colorado Boxed Beef Company (U.S.) and Gary Malenke, Assistant Treasurer of Sioux-Preme Pork Products (U.S.).

As of January 1, 2015, NAMP is now merged into the North American Meat Institute (NAMI).

NAMP was concerned with meat industry issues including nutrition, safety and hygiene, government and regulatory affairs, and standardization. It sponsors an annual convention, an annual business conference, regional meetings, and training programs. It was founded in 1942 and was headquartered in Reston, Virginia. 

Primary membership was limited to firms actively involved in processing meat, including poultry, seafood, and game. Associate membership was available to suppliers to meat processors. 

NAMP was best known, however, for The Meat Buyer's Guide, intended for butchers and commercial meat purchasers, which was a recognized reference for cutting and grading meat. It was published annually. NAMP maintains a standard numbering system for cuts of meat.

Publications 
The Meat Buyer's Guide (John Wiley & Sons, 2004)

References

Food industry trade groups
Organizations established in 1942
Organizations disestablished in 2015
1942 establishments in the United States
2015 disestablishments in the United States
Meat industry organizations